Tall-e Abiz (also Romanized as Tall-e Ābīẕ; also known as Tall-e Bīz and Tol Bīz) is a village in Jereh Rural District, Jereh and Baladeh District, Kazerun County, Fars Province, Iran. At the 2006 census, its population was 801, in 193 families.

References 

Populated places in Kazerun County